The Bluegrass Invitational was a golf tournament on the LPGA Tour from 1965 to 1974. It was played at the Hunting Creek Country Club in Prospect, Kentucky.

Winners
Bluegrass Invitational
1974 JoAnne Carner
1973 Donna Caponi
1972 Kathy Cornelius
1971 JoAnne Carner
1970 Donna Caponi
1969 Mickey Wright

Bluegrass Ladies Invitational
1968 Carol Mann

Bluegrass Invitational
1967 Mickey Wright

Bluegrass Ladies Invitational
1966 Mickey Wright

Blue Grass Invitational
1965 Kathy Whitworth

References

Former LPGA Tour events
Golf in Kentucky
Sports competitions in Louisville, Kentucky
Women's sports in Kentucky
Recurring sporting events established in 1965
Recurring sporting events disestablished in 1974
1965 establishments in Kentucky
1974 disestablishments in Kentucky